Alfred, 2nd Prince of Montenuovo and Grandee of Spain (16 September 18546 September 1927) was one of the highest court officials of Emperor Franz Joseph I of Austria. Among his ancestors were members of the House of Habsburg and the Medici family.

Private life
Prince Alfred of Montenuovo was born in Vienna, Austrian Empire, the only son of Wilhelm, 1st Prince of Montenuovo (1819–1895; son of Adam Albert, Count of Neipperg, and Archduchess Marie Louise of Austria, Empress of The French), and his wife, Countess Juliana Batthyány von Németújvár (1827–1871; daughter of Count János Baptist Batthyány-Strattmann and Countess Marie 
Esterházy von Galántha). His paternal grandmother, Marie Louise, was the Empress consort of Napoleon I of France from 1810 to 1814 and Duchess of Parma from 1814; she was married morganatically to his grandfather Adam Albert in 1821. 

Alfred married on 30 October 1879 in Vienna Countess Franziska Maria Stephania Kinsky von Wchinitz and Tettau (26 December 1861 – 11 July 1935), daughter of Ferdinand Bonaventura, 7th Prince Kinsky of Wchinitz and Tettau, and his wife, Princess Maria  Josepha of Liechtenstein. They had four children:
Princess Juliana Rosa of Montenuovo (15 November 1880 – 27 June 1961), (1) Married in 1903 to Count Dionys Maria Draskovich of Trakostjan (parents of Countess Maria Draskovich of Trakostjan married in 1930 to Albrecht, Duke of Bavaria)  (2) Married in 1914 to Karl, Prince of Oettingen-Oettingen and Oettingen-Wallerstein, no issue. 
Princess Marie of Montenuovo (20 October 1881 – 10 August 1954), married in 1909 to Count Franz Maria of Ledebur-Wicheln, had issue.
Ferdinand, 3rd Prince of Montenuovo (29 May 1888 – 2 May 1951), married in 1927 to Baroness Ilona Solymossy of Loós and Egervár, had issue. Last male of the family. 
Princess Franziska of Montenuovo (22 August 1893 – 3 November 1972), married in 1918 to Prince Maria Leopold von Lobkowicz, had issue.

He inherited the title Prince of Montenuovo in 1895 following the death of his father. 

The prince died in 1927 in his palace at Löwelstrasse 6 in Vienna's city centre after suffering a heart attack. His body was interred at his family's crypt at Bóly (Német-Bóly) in Hungary.

Career
After studying at the Catholic seminary in Salzburg, Alfred started a career as court official, in 1896/97 becoming Obersthofmeister (Grand Master of the Court) of Archduke Otto of Austria, brother of Archduke Franz Ferdinand, the latter of whom was from 1896 heir to the throne.  

In 1898 Emperor Franz Joseph made him Second Obersthofmeister of the imperial court, alongside Prince Rudolf of Liechtenstein. In 1900, Montenuovo was honoured by the Order of the Golden Fleece, the personal order of the dynasty. After Prince Rudolf's death, Montenuovo advanced to First Obersthofmeister in 1909. The Obersthofmeisteramt, as his office was called, among other duties was supervising the court theatres. Montenuovo supported the decision to make Gustav Mahler conductor and director of the I.R. Court Opera. 

Montenuovo was said to have been a lifelong enemy of Franz Ferdinand. Following the assassination of the latter and his morganatic wife Sophie, Duchess of Hohenberg, at Sarajevo in 1914, and with the emperor's connivance, he decided to turn the funeral into a massive and vicious snub.  Even though most foreign royalty had planned to attend, they were pointedly disinvited and the funeral was attended by just the immediate imperial family, with the dead couple's three children excluded from the few public ceremonies. The officer corps was forbidden to salute the funeral train, and this led to a minor revolt led by Archduke Karl, the new heir to the throne. The public viewing of the coffins was curtailed severely and even more scandalously, Montenuovo tried unsuccessfully to make the children foot the bill. The Archduke and Duchess were interred at Artstetten Castle because the Duchess could not be buried at the Imperial Crypt.

In 1917, the new emperor Charles I replaced Montenuovo with Prince Konrad von Hohenlohe-Schillingsfürst.

Honours and arms

Austro-Hungarian orders and decorations
 Knight of the Iron Crown, 1st Class, 1897
 Knight of the Golden Fleece, 1900
 Grand Cross of the Royal Hungarian Order of St. Stephen, 1908
 War Medal (1873)
 Golden Jubilee Court Medal, 1898
 Golden Jubilee Medal for the Armed Forces, 1898
 Jubilee Court Cross

Foreign orders and decorations

Ancestry

References

Sources
thePeerage.com - Alfred Prinz von Montenuovo
The Royal House of Stuart, London, 1969, 1971, 1976, Addington, A. C., Reference: I 65
Genealogisches Handbuch des Adels, Fürstliche Häuser, Reference: 1955 425
Franz Ferdinand - The ruling prevented. Kapitel Die Schüsse von Sarajewo . Chapter The shots of Sarajevo. Österreichischer Bundesverlag, Wien 1983,  . Austrian Federal Verlag, Wien 1983, 

|-

1854 births
1927 deaths
Nobility from Vienna
Austrian Roman Catholics
Grandees of Spain
Knights of the Golden Fleece of Austria
Grand Crosses of the Order of Saint Stephen of Hungary
Grand Crosses of the Order of the Dannebrog
Knights Grand Cross of the Order of Pope Pius IX
Grand Cordons of the Order of the Rising Sun
Recipients of the Order of the Sacred Treasure, 1st class
Grand Crosses of the Order of the Star of Romania
Knights of Malta
Annulled Honorary Knights Grand Cross of the Royal Victorian Order
Recipients of the Order of St. Anna, 2nd class
Recipients of the Order of the White Eagle (Russia)
Obersthofmeister